Sir William Eyre (1 January 1556 – 24 August 1629), of Great Chalfield, Wiltshire, was an English politician.

He was the only son of John Eyre of Wedhampton, Northcombe, and Great Chalfield. He succeeded his father in 1581 and was knighted in 1592.

He was a Member (MP) of the Parliament of England for Wiltshire in 1597 and for Heytesbury in 1604.

He was selected High Sheriff of Wiltshire for 1591–92.

He married three times and was succeeded by his son Sir John, courtier and ambassador, who sold Great Chalfield to the Mayor of London.

References

1556 births
1629 deaths
People from Wiltshire
Knights Bachelor
English MPs 1597–1598
English MPs 1604–1611